Local Motors was an American motor vehicle manufacturing company focused on low-volume manufacturing of open-source motor vehicle designs using multiple microfactories. It was founded in 2007 by John B. Rogers Jr and had headquarters in Phoenix, Arizona. The company’s lineup before its closure included the Rally Fighter and their 3D-printed Strati and Swim vehicles. The company developed vehicles using 3D Printing and utilized vehicle designs provided by the online community. In 2016, the company introduced an autonomous electric-powered shuttle named Olli.

Community
Local Motors' website is a community focusing on vehicle innovation. The content is created by the users who discuss designing, engineering, and building innovative vehicles. Members contribute their own ideas and projects which are discussed with the community.

Co-creation is a technique used by Local Motors, General Electric, and LEGO to enhance new product development. Select organizations partnered with the company to facilitate co-creation of their products including US Army, Domino’s, and Airbus. Local Motors used a co-designing type of customer co-creation in which the selective process is made by its community and some features such as frame and structure are scoped by the company. Firstly, users created drawing designs and the decorative ideas on their own style. Although the users are novices or experts, all users had the opportunity to participate in this step. After that users presented their designs on the website, and the best design selected by people in the community would be developed by the company. Finally, the company launched the co-designing car into the market. Using the co-creation method, the company gained customer’s engagement and loyalty.

One of the biggest community driven competitions was hosted by Local Motors in collaboration with Airbus . This competition was hosted in Berlin, which is one of the tech hubs of Deutsche Ventures.

Propositions
The propositions that Local Motors offered are:

 The car is produced and designed using the co-designing type of co-creation, which is called crowdsourcing.
 The car was produced in 18 months, which is faster than the usual process by five times.
 They were road legal cars.
 The wheels are strong off-road wheels and are grade 8, which are used in the military.
 About $3 million was spent to develop the car, which is less than the amount spent on commercial models by mass automakers.

The company managed to efficiently spend about 3 million dollars by rethinking the car’s features, so they designed a five-point seat belt, which costs $10, instead of developing an airbag, which would cost them $6 million.

Rally Fighter 

The Rally Fighter was the first model produced by Local Motors and is an open sourced vehicle. The car was introduced in 2009 after 18 months of development, which constitutes a record time to market compared to normal automobile industry standards, by applying innovative technologies and crowd sourcing techniques. As the company described it, the Rally Fighter is "a fully capable off-road prerunner, with the amenities and luxuries of an every-day on road vehicle".

Strati

In collaboration with Cincinnati Incorporated and Oak Ridge National Laboratory Local Motors manufactured Strati, the world's first 3D printed electric car. The printing took 44 hours to complete, and was witnessed by a live audience at the 2014 International Manufacturing Technology Show in McCormick Place, Chicago. The car consists of 50 individual parts, far less than a traditional vehicle (which is manufactured with roughly 30,000 parts). The Strati was designed by Michele Anoè, a member of the Local Motors community, and is produced in small quantities to serve strategic partnerships, such as with NXP Semiconductors.

LM3D Swim 

In 2015, the company debuted a 3D-printed car named the LM3D Swim. It was designed by Kevin Lo, a member of the Local Motors community. The materials used are 80 percent ABS plastic and 20 percent carbon fiber. The vehicle uses technology provided by IBM that offered IoT connectivity. The Swim is currently on display at the company’s location in National Harbor, Maryland.

Olli 

In 2016, the company unveiled an autonomous, electric-powered bus. The vehicle was designed by Edgar Sarmiento, initially named the "Berlino" from the Urban Mobility Challenge: Berlin 2030. The French tech entrepreneurs Damien Declerq and Gunnar Graef have been instrumental in organizing the challenge in Berlin. The vehicle was built by Local Motors and has IBM Watson technology installed to provide a personalized experience for riders. The vehicle was demonstrated live to their online audience on Facebook Live at a media event in National Harbor. On January 2, 2018, Local Motors received a pledge of up to a $1 billion in financing and operational support to customers of Olli from Florida-based Elite Transportation Services (ETS) with additional funding of $20 million from Texas-based Xcelerate.

Olli was manufactured in Knoxville, Tennessee using additive manufacturing techniques, including 3D Printing. Traditional Steel-Tube chassis Olli vehicles were produced in Chandler, Arizona.  The company has not announced pricing yet.

Miami-Dade County, the State of Nevada and the Danish Vesthimmerland Municipality expressed interest in using Olli on their roadways.
As of January 2020, Olli has been deployed at the United Nations ITCILO campus in Turin, Italy to provide transport shuttle to employees and guests within the campus.

On December 17, 2021, an Olli bus being operated by Durham Region Transit in Whitby, Ontario suddenly lost control and crashed into a tree. The attendant was critically injured and rushed to a trauma center in neighbouring Toronto. It was later revealed that the bus was being driven in manual mode.

Locations 
Local Motors had facilities in Phoenix, and Knoxville.

In February 2017, Local Motors closed its Las Vegas location.

Closure
Local Motors closed on 14 January 2022, with their closure announced by Chris Stoner, their former VP of sales and customer success.

See also
 Open design
 Microfactory
 Open innovation
 Creative Commons

References

External links 
 Local Motors Website
 About John B. Rogers Jr. Archived copy

2007 establishments in Arizona
Car manufacturers of the United States
Manufacturing companies based in Phoenix, Arizona
Electric vehicle manufacturers of the United States
Open hardware vehicles
3D printed objects
Vehicle manufacturing companies established in 2007
Vehicle manufacturing companies disestablished in 2022
American companies established in 2007
American companies disestablished in 2022